Joseph Edèse Bujold (September 18, 1919 – April 22, 2001) was a Canadian politician. He served in the Legislative Assembly of New Brunswick from 1970 to 1974 as member of the New Brunswick Liberal Association.

References

1919 births
2001 deaths
20th-century Canadian legislators
New Brunswick Liberal Association MLAs
People from Carleton-sur-Mer